Cuterebra austeni is a species of new world skin bot flies in the family Oestridae.

References

Further reading

External links

 Diptera.info
 NCBI Taxonomy Browser, Cuterebra austeni

Oestridae
Insects described in 1986